Goleh-ye Cheshmeh or Galleh Cheshmeh may refer to:
 Goleh-ye Cheshmeh, South Khorasan